Paulo Junior dos Santos Gomes (born 25 October 2000), commonly known as Paulo Junior, is a professional Cape Verdean footballer who last played for Fortuna Liga club AS Trenčín as a midfielder.

Club career

AS Trenčín
Paulo Junior made his Fortuna Liga debut for AS Trenčín in an away fixture against Slovan Bratislava on 22 February 2020. He was fielded as a late replacement for Abdul Zubairu, as Trenčín was two down. The match concluded in a 2:0 defeat. Trenčín did not renew his contract in the winter of 2020-21.

References

External links
 AS Trenčín official club profile 
 
 Futbalnet profile 
 

2000 births
Living people
People from Praia
Cape Verdean footballers
Cape Verdean expatriate footballers
Association football midfielders
AS Trenčín players
Slovak Super Liga players
Expatriate footballers in Slovakia
Cape Verdean expatriate sportspeople in Slovakia